Oban Cathedral  may refer to:

 St. Columba's Cathedral — cathedral of the Roman Catholic Diocese of Argyll and the Isles
 St John's Cathedral, Oban — cathedral of the Scottish Episcopal Diocese of Argyll and the Isles